Anna Margaretha Marina Astrid "Vivianne" Miedema (born 15 July 1996) is a Dutch professional footballer who plays as a forward for FA Women's Super League (FA WSL) club Arsenal and the Netherlands national team. She previously played for Bayern Munich and SC Heerenveen.

Regularly cited as one of the greatest strikers in modern women's football, Miedema is the all-time leading scorer in the FA WSL and has scored more goals at the international level for the Netherlands than any other player, across both the women's and men's teams. She won the UEFA Women's Euro in 2017 with the Dutch national team, two consecutive Frauen-Bundesliga titles with Bayern Munich in 2015 and 2016, and the 2018–19 FA WSL title with Arsenal. In 2019, she led the Netherlands to a second-place finish at the 2019 FIFA Women's World Cup in France.

Miedema won the BBC Women's Footballer of the Year award in November 2021. In 2020, she was named Women's Player of the Year at the London Football Awards and by England's Football Writers' Association. She was named PFA Women's Players' Player of the Year in 2019. She was shortlisted for the Ballon d'Or Féminin in 2019, 2021, and 2022. She was named to the Top 10 of The Guardian The 100 Best Female Footballers In The World in 2017, 2019, 2020, 2021, and 2022.

Early life
Born and raised in Hoogeveen, Miedema grew up watching her father play football and at five years old began playing herself for HZVV in her hometown. Her first memory of playing football involves her two front teeth being kicked out by a young goalkeeper at age six. She was a frequent goalscorer from a very young age and played on boys' teams. When opponents laughed when they saw a girl on the pitch, it triggered her to score many goals, which she often did. After several years of playing for HZVV, she joined VV De Weide in 2009 and stayed with them until 2011.

With her father and younger brother Lars, Miedema would often travel  to Rotterdam in order to watch Feyenoord play. At age 14, Miedema was forced to make the decision to switch to playing for the top women's league or to continue playing with boys' clubs.

Club career

2011–2014: SC Heerenveen 
After receiving an offer from SC Heerenveen, Miedema signed her first professional contract as a 14-year-old and found herself playing in the Eredivisie, the top Dutch women's league, with players much older than herself. She made her senior debut at 15 during a match against FC Utrecht on 2 September 2011, becoming the youngest ever player in the league. In her debut season, the 2011–12 Eredivisie, she scored 10 goals in 17 games for Heerenveen, who finished last of seven teams. Despite being a teenager, she shared the accolades of being the second-highest scorer in the league.

In 2012–13, playing in the new cross-border BeNe League, she improved her tally to 27 goals in 26 games. Her 41 goals in 26 games for Heerenveen in the 2013–14 BeNe League season earned her the top-scorer award at the age of 17. Her goal tally was 15 more than the nearest player.

2014–2017: Bayern Munich 

39 different clubs made inquiries about signing Miedema, before she signed a three-year contract with Bayern Munich in the top German league, the Frauen-Bundesliga in June 2014. During the 2014–15 season, she was part of a Bayern team that remained unbeaten in the Bundesliga and won the title for the first time since 1976. Miedema scored her first league goals in Germany on 5 October 2014 in a match against MSV Duisburg, leading to Bayern's 6–0 win. In the match against SGS Essen on 30 November, Miedema tore the outer band of her ankle resulting in some time away from the pitch. She re-emerged in the German league on 22 February 2015 against VfL Wolfsburg, scoring again in the following match, against Bayer Leverkusen. Miedema finished the season with 7 goals in 17 matches. She helped Bayern Munich defend the title the following season with 14 goals in 22 matches.

Miedema had been unhappy during her first three months in Germany because she could not speak German or English. Although she overcame these difficulties, she later grew dissatisfied with Bayern's long ball tactics. In the 2016–17 Frauen-Bundesliga season, Miedema scored 14 goals in 22 appearances but Bayern were deposed as champions by VfL Wolfsburg. She added eight goals in the 2016–17 UEFA Women's Champions League as Bayern reached the quarter final, in which they were beaten 4–1 on aggregate by Paris Saint-Germain. Miedema was the top scorer of the Champions League season.

Miedema entered into contract negotiations with other leading clubs in Europe and the United States in 2017. Although Bayern wanted to keep her, they were not prepared to break their pay structure. Despite leading some "tough negotiations" with Miedema, manager Karin Danner was resigned to her departure: "she really wanted to change and we didn't want to break our structure for her in the end." Bayern signed Miedema's compatriots Jill Roord and Lineth Beerensteyn as her replacements.

2017–present: Arsenal 
In May 2017, Miedema moved to English club Arsenal. On 29 October, she scored her first goal in the FA Women's Super League (FA WSL) for Arsenal in the match with Everton in the 23rd minute. During a match against Liverpool, she scored the game-opening goal in the 29th minute and provided the assist to Dominique Janssen's goal in the 49th minute lifting Arsenal to a 3–0 win. Miedema finished the 2017–18 season with 4 goals in the 11 matches she played, including 9 starts. Arsenal finished in third place during the regular season with a  record. The club also won the 2017–18 FA WSL Cup, with Miedema scoring the game-winning goal of the final, a 1–0 victory over Manchester City.

In the first match of the 2018–19 season, Miedema scored a hat-trick as Arsenal defeated Liverpool 5–0. She brought her goals tally into double-digits with a brace against Bristol City in a 4–0 Arsenal victory. Miedema finished the season as the WSL top scorer with 22 goals and was named PFA Women's Players' Player of the Year. Arsenal finished first in the regular season with a  record, marking the first time the club had clinched the title since 2012.

On 16 October 2019, Miedema scored four goals in Arsenal's 5–2 victory against Slavia Praha in the 2019–20 UEFA Women's Champions League. Five days later, she was shortlisted for the Ballon d'Or Féminin for 2019, in which she placed fifth.

During the 2019–20 season, she scored 16 goals in 14 games. Miedema was influential in the largest victory in the history of the WSL on 1 December 2019 – of the 11 goals scored by Arsenal against Bristol City, she scored six and set up four others. The 11th was the only one she was not directly involved in; she was not on the pitch when it was scored. The FA suspended the season because of the COVID-19 pandemic, deciding the competition based on points per game. Arsenal finished in third place with a  record and played in the 2019–20 FA WSL Cup, where they eventually lost 2–1 to Chelsea during the 2020 FA Women's League Cup Final.

On 18 October 2020, Miedema became the first player to score 50 WSL goals, overtaking the all-time league record of 49 (set by Nikita Parris) when she scored a hat-trick in a 6–1 win against Tottenham Hotspur. On 7 February 2021, Manchester City forward Ellen White became the all-time record goal scorer, having scored 55 times to Miedema's 54. On 7 March, Miedema overtook White again, having scored 56 times. Of Miedema's first 52 WSL goals she scored 34 times with her right foot, 14 with her left, and 4 headers. None of the goals came from a penalty. On average she scored once every 83 minutes, compared to Parris' 171 minutes.

On 9 September 2021, Miedema scored her 100th goal for Arsenal Women, completing a hattrick in a 4–0 win against Slavia Prague in the Women's Champions League qualifier. Miedema required only 110 games in all competitions to reach this milestone. In November 2021 she became the first player in the history of the WSL to score against every team they have faced, after scoring against Manchester United.

On 20 May 2022 Miedema announced she had extended her contract with Arsenal. She had had talks with Barcelona Femení and Paris Saint-Germain Féminine who had been interested in signing her. She said that winning titles with Arsenal would mean more to her than joining a team that was winning titles already. The lucrative new contract made her the highest-paid female player in England.

On 15 December 2022, Miedema left a UEFA Women's Champions League match against Lyon at halftime with an injury, which on 19 December was confirmed to be an anterior cruciate ligament tear. She was expected to undergo surgery and miss "an extended period of time".

International career

Youth
In October 2012 Miedema broke the goalscoring record for the Netherlands women's national under-17 football team, when she scored six goals against Montenegro then eight goals against Kazakhstan in the 2013 UEFA Women's Under-17 Championship qualification mini tournament. The eight goals in the 15–0 win over Kazakhstan also set a competition record for goals in a single match, and four more goals in the next match against Ukraine made her the all-time UEFA Women's Under-17 Championship top scorer. She scored a total of 22 goals for the under-17s, in her 11 appearances between October 2011 and October 2012.

On 6 March 2013, Miedema debuted for the Netherlands women's national under-19 football team, starting a 3–1 defeat by Iceland. At the 2014 UEFA Women's Under-19 Championship, she was vital for the Dutch success, her six goals in the tournament guided the Netherlands to their first-ever title in women's football. She scored a hat-trick in the 4–0 semi final win over the Republic of Ireland, and the only goal in the final win over Spain. She was the tournament top scorer by a margin of four goals and also collected the Golden Player awarded by UEFA to the best player of the tournament. Already a senior national team player, she concluded her under-19 national team career with seven goals from 10 appearances.

Senior

On 26 September 2013, Miedema made her debut for the Netherlands women's national football team. She was an 84th-minute substitute for Lieke Martens in a 4–0 2015 FIFA Women's World Cup qualification – UEFA Group 5 win over Albania in Tirana. One month later she scored her first goals at the senior international level, a 16-minute hat-trick, in the Netherlands' 7–0 2015 FIFA Women's World Cup qualification – UEFA Group 5 win over Portugal.

In October 2014, Miedema played a key role in the Netherlands' World Cup qualification play-off victory over Scotland. In the first leg at Tynecastle Stadium, her long-range shot was deflected by Scotland goalkeeper Gemma Fay, before Martens converted the rebound. The Dutch were awarded a penalty kick after Miedema was fouled by Frankie Brown inside the box. Manon Melis scored on the penalty kick lifting the Dutch to a 2–1 win ahead of the second leg in Rotterdam.

In the final qualification play-off versus Italy, Miedema scored all of the Dutch goals as the Netherlands won 3–2 on aggregate and advanced to the 2015 FIFA Women's World Cup. She finished as the overall top-scorer in the qualification campaign with 16 goals. Coach Roger Reijners praised Miedema's "killer instinct". Despite being still in her teens, she was widely proclaimed "the most gifted striker in Europe" ahead of the Netherlands' first-ever FIFA Women's World Cup appearance. At the age of 18, her 16 goals during the qualifying tournament matched the previous European record set by Adriana Martín and established Miedema as the seventh-highest goalscorer in the history of UEFA women's national team competitions.

Miedema arrived at the finals in Canada with migraines and an injured foot. Despite the high expectations, a decidedly "off colour" Miedema was unable to replicate her pre-tournament form and failed to score as the Netherlands reached the round of 16 by finishing third in their group, and then lost 2–1 to Japan. She was frustrated by a lack of service which reduced her opportunities to score. Two years later Miedema admitted that the pressure on her at the 2015 World Cup felt "crazy", and she was pleased that other talented Dutch players had emerged afterward to take some of the attention away from her. In 2022 she revealed she nearly quit professional football following the 2015 World Cup finals.

At the 2017 UEFA Women's European Championship she continued to excel under pressure, scoring a goal in the hosts' 3–0 semi-final win over England. Miedema also netted two goals in the final against Denmark, which was enough to secure the first-ever Euro title for the Dutch. After the tournament the whole team was honoured by the Prime Minister Mark Rutte and Minister of Sport Edith Schippers and made Knights of the Order of Orange-Nassau.

On 15 June 2019, Miedema became the all-time top scorer of the Netherlands women's national football team after scoring her 60th goal in a 3–1 win against Cameroon at the 2019 FIFA Women's World Cup in France. She passed the record held by Melis and extended her lead of the men's team's leading scorer, Robin van Persie. During the Netherlands' 2–0 quarter-final victory over Italy, she scored both goals, was named Player of the Match, and led the Dutch team to its first–ever World Cup semi-final. Miedema's performance throughout the tournament was instrumental in leading the Netherlands to the final, where they fell 2–0 to defending champions United States.

At the 2020 Summer Olympics held in Tokyo in 2021, Miedema broke the Olympic record by scoring ten goals in four matches. In the group matches she scored four against Zambia and two each against Brazil and China. In the quarter-final against the United States, her 100th match for the Netherlands, Miedema scored both Dutch goals in the 2–2 draw. In the penalty shoot-out, US goalkeeper Alyssa Naeher saved Miedema's penalty, and the Dutch were eliminated.

In the first match at the 2022 UEFA Women's European Championship in England, against Sweden, Miedema took over the captaincy when Sari van Veenendaal had to leave the pitch injured. Miedema missed the next two group stage matches due to a COVID-19 infection. She wore the captain's armband again in the quarter-final match against France, which the Netherlands lost 1–0.

Style of play
Miedema grew up as a Feyenoord supporter and modelled her game on Robin van Persie. As she is Dutch and wore number 10 for Bayern Munich, she has been compared to Arjen Robben. Journalist David Winner, author of a book about Dutch football, sees her style of play as a mix of Marco van Basten and Dennis Bergkamp. Described as intense and a prolific goalscorer, Miedema does not set goalscoring targets for herself. Former Arsenal striker Kelly Smith said of Miedema, "She scores goals with her left and right foot, her head, she sets goals up. For me, she is just the complete striker, and she's the best in the world at the moment. She's always a threat no matter what minute of the game it is. I think her movement is very clever, and her finishing ability is phenomenal. When she's in front of goal it's just this calm, composed approach that she has." Former Swedish international, Nilla Fischer described Miedema as an intelligent and clever player: "She really tries to go on your blind spot and then make a move when you're not ready."

In 2019, Miedema said she plays more like an attacking midfielder: "I know I have my goalscoring qualities, but I like setting people up. I like to drop and pick up the ball and see if I can send someone through on goal." In early 2022 she started playing in midfield rather than in attack. Former Arsenal and England player Ian Wright called her the best striker and the best playmaker in the world at the same time. She is known for  celebrating goals and attributes her modest approach to the down-to-earth nature of her hometown: "I don't like to be the person everyone watches. It's my job. I'm happy if someone else scores. I celebrate more."

Personal life
Miedema is in a relationship with England footballer and Arsenal teammate Beth Mead. Miedema was previously in a relationship with Scottish footballer and ex-Arsenal teammate, Lisa Evans, for six years.

Her younger brother, Lars, is also a footballer, who as of 2020 was playing for FC Den Bosch. Known for her lack of interest in overtly celebrating her goals, she made a rare exception upon becoming the Netherlands' top scorer in 2019 after her brother insisted she mark the achievement.

Miedema is a co-author of Vivianne voetbalt, a series of children's comic books featuring her, written in her native Dutch language.

Miedema is studying for a UEFA-B coaching licence. In 2021 she earned a master's degree in Football Business from the Johan Cruyff Institute.

In 2019 Miedema became an ambassador of War Child, a charity supporting children in war zones. In November 2021, Miedema joined the charity movement Common Goal, committing 1% of her salary to community organisations working with young people. Miedema said "I'm lucky to be living my dream and I feel the responsibility to help others live theirs too. I'm excited to join Common Goal and to be able to really scale the impact I can have off the field." In March 2022 she led Common Goal's emergency response to the help victims of Russia's invasion of Ukraine, together with Juventus player Paulo Dybala.

In September 2022, Miedema opened a Cruyff Court bearing her name in Hoogeveen, on the location where she used to play as a child.

Career statistics

Club

International

Honours
Bayern Munich
 Bundesliga: 2014–15, 2015–16

Arsenal
 FA WSL: 2018–19; runners-up: 2021–22
 FA Women's Cup runners-up: 2017–18, 2020–21
 FA WSL Cup: 2017–18; runners-up: 2018–19, 2019–20
 

Netherlands U19
 UEFA Women's Under-19 Championship: 2014

Netherlands
 UEFA Women's Championship: 2017
 FIFA Women's World Cup runners-up: 2019
 Tournoi de France: runner-up 2020

Individual
 UEFA Women's Under-19 Championship Golden Player: 2014
 UEFA Women's Under-19 Championship top goalscorer: 2014
 BeNe League top goalscorer: 2013–14
 UEFA Women's Champions League top goalscorer: 2016–17, 2019–20
 UEFA Women's Championship Silver Boot: 2017
 BBC Women's Footballer of the Year: 2021
 FIFA Women's World Cup All-Star Squad: 2019
 FIFA FIFPro Women's World11: 2020, 2021
 IFFHS Women's World Team: 2020
 PFA Women's Players' Player of the Year: 2018–19
 FA Women's Super League Golden Boot: 2018–19, 2019–20
 FWA Women's Footballer of Year: 2019–20
 London Football Awards Women's Player of the Year: 2018–19, 2019–20
 Football Supporters' Association Player of the Year: 2019, 2020, 2021
 WSL PFA Fans' Player of the Year: 2019–20
 Her Football Hub Player of the Year: 2020
 PFA Team of the Year: 2018–19, 2019–20, 2021–22
 FA Women's Super League Player of the Month: October 2018, December 2019, October 2020
 FA Women's Super League Goal of the Month: December 2022

Records

Eredivisie 
Youngest player: age 15.

WSL 
Most goals scored in league's history: 64.
Most goal involvements: 75.

Most first-half hat-tricks: 2. 
Most goals in a single season: 22.
Most goals in a single game: 6.
Most goal involvements in a single game: 10 (6 goals, 4 assists).
First player involved in 100 goals.
First player to score against all clubs.

Netherlands 
Most goals for the Under-17 team: 14.
Most goals in senior team: 95.

Continental 
Most goals in one match for UEFA Under-17 matches: 8.
Most goals in UEFA Under-17 matches: 22.
Most goals in European qualifying matches for a World Cup: 16 (equal with Adriana Martín).

Olympics 
Most goals in a single Olympic tournament: 10.

See also 

 The 100 Best Female Footballers In The World
 List of foreign FA Women's Super League players
 List of FA WSL hat-tricks

Notes

References

Further reading
 Grainey, Timothy (2012), Beyond Bend It Like Beckham: The Global Phenomenon of Women's Soccer, University of Nebraska Press, 
 Postma, Annemarie (2017), De Oranje leeuwinnen: het Nederlands vrouweneftal, Ambo/Anthos B.V., 
 Raphael, Amy and Gary Lineker (2019), A Game of Two-Halves: Famous Football Fans Meet Their Heroes, Atlantic Books, 
 Reijnders, Joke and Anna Margaretha Marina Astrid Miedema (2018), Meidenvoetbal: met tips en trucs van de spits van de Oranjeleeuwinnen, Karakter Uitgevers BV,  
 Vissers, Willem (2019), Meisjesdromen: van EK-debuut tot WK-finale in tien jaar, Overamstel Uitgevers,

External links

Profile at Onsoranje.nl (in Dutch)
Profile  at vrouwenvoetbalnederland.nl (in Dutch)
Profile at uefa.com
Profile at arsenal.com
Player German domestic football stats  at DFB

1996 births
2015 FIFA Women's World Cup players
2019 FIFA Women's World Cup players
Living people
People from Hoogeveen
Dutch women's footballers
Netherlands women's international footballers
Dutch expatriate sportspeople in Germany
FC Bayern Munich (women) players
Women's association football forwards
Expatriate women's footballers in Germany
Eredivisie (women) players
SC Heerenveen (women) players
Arsenal W.F.C. players
Women's Super League players
Dutch expatriate sportspeople in England
Expatriate women's footballers in England
UEFA Women's Championship-winning players
Knights of the Order of Orange-Nassau
Frauen-Bundesliga players
LGBT association football players
Dutch LGBT sportspeople
Lesbian sportswomen
Dutch expatriate women's footballers
Footballers at the 2020 Summer Olympics
Olympic footballers of the Netherlands
FIFA Century Club
UEFA Women's Euro 2022 players
Footballers from Drenthe
UEFA Women's Euro 2017 players
Association footballers' wives and girlfriends